Caliao is one of ten parishes (administrative divisions) in Caso, a municipality within the province and autonomous community of Asturias, in northern Spain.

The postal code is 33995.

Places 
El Balséu 
La Braña Uxil 
La Braña Vieya 
La Cabritera 
Les Cases d'Abaxu 
Los Collaos 
El Cotu 
La Encruceyada 
Les Felguerines 
Fresnéu 
La Fresnosa 
Los Oyancos 
Pandefresnu 
Prendeoriu 
Riafresnu 
La Vega'l Cándanu

References 

Parishes in Caso